Andre Camel may refer to:

 André Camel (Case Closed), a fictional FBI agent in Case Closed
 André Camel (rugby) (1905 – 1980), rugby union footballer who played in the 1920s and 1930s for France; see 1935 FIRA Tournament